Jelovec ( or  or) is a settlement on the left bank of the Drava River west of Maribor in northeastern Slovenia. It belongs to the City Municipality of Maribor.

References

External links
Jelovec on Geopedia

Populated places in the City Municipality of Maribor